Nonce may refer to:
 Cryptographic nonce, a number or bit string used only once, in security engineering
 Nonce word, a word used to meet a need that is not expected to recur
 The Nonce, American rap duo
 Nonce orders, an architectural term
 Nonce, a slang term chiefly used in Britain for alleged or convicted sex offenders, especially ones involving children

See also
 Nuncio, the apostolic and diplomatic representation of the Holy See
 Hapax legomenon, in corpus linguistics